NXT TakeOver: New Orleans was the 19th NXT TakeOver professional wrestling livestreaming event produced by WWE. It was held exclusively for wrestlers from the promotion's NXT brand division. The event aired exclusively on the WWE Network and took place on April 7, 2018, at the Smoothie King Center in New Orleans, Louisiana as part of the WrestleMania 34 weekend festivities.

Five matches were contested at the event. In the main event, Johnny Gargano defeated Tommaso Ciampa in an Unsanctioned match and was reinstated to NXT. On the undercard, Aleister Black defeated Andrade Cien Almas to win the NXT Championship, Shayna Baszler defeated Ember Moon to capture the NXT Women's Championship, and Adam Cole won a six-man ladder match to become the inaugural NXT North American Champion.

The event received universal acclaim from wrestling fans and critics and both the NXT North American Championship match and the Unsanctioned match between Gargano and Ciampa both received five-star ratings by wrestling journalist Dave Meltzer. It was the first time Meltzer gave five stars to two matches on the same North American show.

Production

Background
TakeOver was a series of professional wrestling shows that began in May 2014, as WWE's then-developmental league NXT held their second WWE Network-exclusive event, billed as TakeOver. In subsequent months, the "TakeOver" moniker became the brand used by WWE for all of their NXT live specials. TakeOver: New Orleans was scheduled as the 19th NXT TakeOver event and was held on  April 7, 2018, as a support show for WrestleMania 34. It was held at the Smoothie King Center and was named after the venue's city of New Orleans, Louisiana. 

This was also the first TakeOver event to feature Spanish play-by-play commentary live from ringside, as Spanish color commentator Marcelo Rodriguez announced via Twitter. Former Indianapolis Colts punter and Barstool Sports personality Pat McAfee was announced to join the Pre-Show panel.

Storylines

The card comprised five matches. The matches resulted from scripted storylines, where wrestlers portrayed heroes, villains, or less distinguishable characters that built tension and culminated in a wrestling match or series of matches. Results were predetermined by WWE's writers on the NXT brand, while storylines were produced on their weekly television program, NXT.

On the February 28 episode of NXT, Andrade Cien Almas and Zelina Vega boasted about their victory over Johnny Gargano. Then Aleister Black and Killian Dain came out and the three brawled. The following week, Black defeated Dain to become the number one contender to the NXT Championship and would face Almas at TakeOver: New Orleans.

At TakeOver: Philadelphia, Ember Moon defeated Shayna Baszler to retain the NXT Women's Championship. After the match, Baszler attacked Moon. On the February 7 episode of NXT, Baszler stated that Moon was afraid of her. Later, a tweet from Moon was shown challenging Baszler to a rematch from TakeOver: Philadelphia for the title for the following week. The following week, the rematch ended in a disqualification when Kairi Sane attacked Baszler, thus allowing Moon to retain. Two weeks later, after defeating Sane, Baszler called out Moon. On the March 14 episode, after a match that saw Dakota Kai defeat Lacey Evans, Baszler came down and attacked Kai. Moon came out and then proceeded to brawl with Baszler, which saw Moon stand tall after an Eclipse. The following week after Moon defeated Aliyah, Baszler and Moon argued back and forth.

On the February 21 episode of NXT, NXT General Manager William Regal announced that there would be a Dusty Rhodes Tag Team Classic and the winner would receive a shot at NXT Tag Team Championship at Takeover: New Orleans. The tournament began on the March 7 episode of NXT. Over the next couple of weeks, Authors of Pain, Sanity, Street Profits and Pete Dunne and Roderick Strong, who replaced the previously announced Tyler Bate and Trent Seven after Bate suffered a knee injury, advanced to the next round by defeating TM-61, Riddick Moss and Tino Sabbatelli, Heavy Machinery and Danny Burch and Oney Lorcan, respectively. The semifinal saw The Authors of Pain and Dunne and Strong advance to the finals by defeating Street Profits and Sanity, respectively. The finals featured The Authors of Pain face the team of Strong and Dunne, which ended in a no contest when The Undisputed ERA interfered. Regal then scheduled a triple threat tag team match for the tag team titles and the Dusty Classic trophy at TakeOver: New Orleans.

On the March 28 episode of NXT, NXT General Manager William Regal announced the introduction of the new NXT North American Championship. He was interrupted by EC3, who was making his return to WWE after previously appearing under the ring name Derrick Bateman. EC3 was subsequently announced by Regal as one of six wrestlers who would compete in a ladder match at TakeOver: New Orleans to crown the inaugural champion. Later that night, Regal also announced the other five participants as Adam Cole, Velveteen Dream, Lars Sullivan, Killian Dain and the debuting Ricochet.

At TakeOver: Chicago in May 2017, Johnny Gargano and Tommaso Ciampa, then teaming together in DIY, were defeated by The Authors of Pain in a ladder match, failing to win back the NXT Tag Team Championship. After the match, Gargano and Ciampa stood on the stage, expressing sadness of defeat. Ciampa then turned on Gargano, attacking him and putting him through two tables. Ciampa explained his attack by revealing that he had sustained an ACL injury and would be out for several months, during which time he suspected that Gargano would try to replace him in their team. At TakeOver: Philadelphia, Gargano was defeated by Andrade "Cien" Almas to retain the NXT Championship. After the match, with Gargano leaving up the ramp, Ciampa made his first appearance since the betrayal by attacking Gargano with a crutch. Gargano subsequently put his NXT career on the line for another title shot against Almas, only to lose after interference from Ciampa, costing Gargano his NXT contract. Over the next few weeks, Gargano developed an obsession for getting back at Ciampa, going as far as ambushing him outside the WWE Performance Center and attempting to break into his house. An unsanctioned match (due to Gargano no longer being contracted to NXT) between the two was made official on the March 28 episode of NXT, with the added stipulation of Gargano being restored to NXT if he won.

Event

Preliminary matches 
The event opened with a musical performance from Cane Hill. The first match on the card was a ladder match for the NXT North American Championship involving EC3, Ricochet, Adam Cole, Velveteen Dream, Lars Sullivan and Killian Dain. In the end, Ricochet attempted to retrieve the title but Cole pushed the ladder, causing Ricochet to fall. Cole retrieved the title to win the match.

Next, Ember Moon defended the NXT Women's Championship against Shayna Baszler. Moon went for the "Eclipse", but Baszler countered and applied the "Kirifuda Clutch" on Moon, who passed out. As a result, Baszler won the title by technical submission.

After that, the Dusty Rhodes Tag Team Classic tournament finals took place with The Undisputed Era (Adam Cole and Kyle O'Reilly) defending the NXT Tag Team Championship against The Authors of Pain (Akam and Rezar) and Roderick Strong and WWE United Kingdom Champion Pete Dunne. Dunne performed the "Bitter End" on O’Reilly, but Strong attacked Dunne, voiding the pinfall at a two count. Strong performed "End of Heartache" on Dunne and placed O'Reilly on top of Dunne, thus The Undisputed Era retained the titles and won the tournament in the process. After the match, Strong put on Cole's Undisputed Era armband, turning heel and joining and celebrating with the group.

In the penultimate match, Andrade Cien Almas, accompanied by Zelina Vega, defended the NXT Championship against Aleister Black. Whilst the referee was distracted, Vega performed a hurricanrana off the ring apron into the steel steps on Black; Almas subsequently scored a near-fall. Black performed the "Black Mass" on Almas, but Vega placed Almas’ foot on the bottom rope, voiding the pinfall at a two count. Almas performed a double knee smash on Black, who was seated in the corner, for a near-fall. Almas performed another double knee smash on Black, who was seated against the ring post, and attempted an elevated hammerlock DDT, but Black countered and performed a topé con hilo on the outside. Almas performed a hammerlock DDT on Black for a near-fall. Vega dove off the top rope, though Black ducked, and Almas caught Vega, allowing Black to perform the "Black Mass" on Almas to win the title.

Main event 
In the main event, Johnny Gargano faced Tommaso Ciampa in an unsanctioned match. Ciampa performed a suplex on Gargano off the announce table. Gargano performed a powerbomb on Ciampa off the ring apron onto the exposed concrete. Gargano struck Ciampa with a crutch and performed a slingshot DDT on Ciampa for a near-fall. Gargano applied the "Garga-No-Escape", only for Ciampa to rake Gargano's eyes. Ciampa performed a "Project Ciampa" on Gargano for a near-fall. Gargano performed a "Lawn Dart" into an exposed turnbuckle and two superkicks on Ciampa, who was kneeling, for a near-fall. Ciampa then performed a "Project Ciampa" from the second rope on Gargano for a near-fall. In the end,  Ciampa attempted to strike Gargano with his knee brace, however Gargano countered and applied the "Garga-No-Escape", transitioning into an STF using the knee brace. Ciampa submitted, thus Gargano won and was reinstated in NXT.

Reception

The event received universal acclaim from fans and critics. Gene Guillot of The Times-Picayune described the show as "wrestling at its finest", involving "spectacular wrestling and incredible story telling" with "moment after moment of high impact". Guillot wrote that the "show kicked off with one of the best matches in NXT history and finished with another Match of the Year candidate that told one of the great stories in wrestling history". John Moore of Pro Wrestling Dot Net wrote that "each match delivered at a main event level", describing the main event between Gargano and Ciampa as a "perfect end of their year long tale". Matty Paddock of The Independent wrote that the event "delivered in breathtaking style", calling it "a classic night of wrestling that will be hard to match". Dave Meltzer of the Wrestling Observer Newsletter gave both the ladder match for the NXT North American Championship and the unsanctioned match five stars, making them the second and third five-star matches NXT had put on in 2018.

Results

Dusty Rhodes Tag Team Classic bracket

References

External links

 

New Orleans
2018 WWE Network events
Professional wrestling in New Orleans
2018 in Louisiana
Events in New Orleans
April 2018 events in the United States